Mike Kunigonis (born June 4, 1980) is the head baseball coach of the Northern Illinois Huskies baseball program at Northern Illinois University. He was named to that position prior to the 2015 season.

Early years
Kunigonis was raised in Worcester, Massachusetts. He attended Saint Peter-Marian High School in Worcester.

Playing career
Kunigonis attended American International College in Springfield, Massachusetts. He played for the Division II Yellow Jackets from 1999–2002. A Butova Sportsmanship Award Winner in his Junior year, Michael was also selected as an all–region and all–conference player as a first baseman.

Along with his playing career at American International, Kunigonis graduated with a Bachelor of Science in criminal justice and sociology in 2001. While coaching at Canisius College in 2006, he earned a Master of Science in sports administration.

Coaching career
Following his graduation, Kunigonis spent five seasons working as an assistant coach and recruiting coordinator at two schools in Western New York. In 2003 and 2004, he worked at Niagara University in Lewiston, and from 2005–2007 at Canisius College in Buffalo. During his tenure at both schools, they reached the Metro Atlantic Athletic Conference baseball tournament. For the 2008 season, Kunigonis was an assistant at Radford University.

Kunigonis joined the coaching staff at Virginia Tech prior to the 2009 season, as a volunteer assistant coach. He worked as a volunteer assistant for both the 2009 and 2010 season before being promoted to a full-time assistant coaching position. Kunigonis was promoted to the Hokies hitting coach. Under his guidance, the Hokies had a banner season in 2013, and had one of the highest draft picks in Virginia Tech history with infielder Chad Pinder, who was selected by the Oakland Athletics with the 71st overall pick in the 2013 Major League Baseball Draft.

On January 5, 2015, Kunigonis was announced as the new head coach at Northern Illinois University.

Kunigonis received his first career win against South Dakota State on February 13, 2015, in his head coaching debut, by a score of 10–6. Under Kunigonis NIU Baseball has seen great success in the classroom and in the community. NIU Baseball has been named Community Service Male Team of the year five times for NIU Athletics as well as winning the Victor's Cup for best overall Male Team twice.

Head coaching record
The following is a table of Kunigonis' yearly records as an NCAA head baseball coach.

References

1980 births
Living people
Baseball coaches from Massachusetts
American International Yellow Jackets baseball players
Niagara Purple Eagles baseball coaches
Canisius Golden Griffins baseball coaches
Virginia Tech Hokies baseball coaches
Northern Illinois Huskies baseball coaches
Baseball players from Worcester, Massachusetts
Canisius College alumni